Alas Chiricanas Flight 901, registered HP-1202AC, was an Embraer EMB 110 Bandeirante aircraft flying en route from Colón city to Panama City which exploded shortly after departing Enrique Adolfo Jiménez Airport, on the night of July 19, 1994. All 21 on board, including 12 Jews, were killed in the bombing. Both Panamanian and American authorities consider the bombing an unsolved crime and an act of terrorism.

The wreckage of the Bandeirante was strewn about the Santa Rita Mountains near Colón. Panamanian investigators quickly determined that the explosion had been caused by a bomb, probably detonated by a suicide bomber aboard the aircraft. Only one body was not claimed by relatives; this body is believed to be that of a man named Jamal Lya. Officials suspected that the incident was an act of terrorism by Hezbollah directed against Jews in part because it took place one day after the AMIA bombing in Buenos Aires, and due to an expression of support by "Ansar Allah", a Hezbollah affiliate in South America.

In 2018, the President of Panama Juan Carlos Varela said "recent evidence" and intelligence reports "clearly show it was a terrorist attack," and that he would ask local and international authorities to reopen the investigation. The FBI have in its investigations identified the perpetrator to have been a passenger named Ali Hawa Jamal.

See also
List of unsolved murders
Air India Flight 182
Avianca Flight 203
Cubana Flight 455
Pan Am Flight 103
UTA Flight 772

References

External links
Acquittals in Argentine terror case cast a shadow across Panama
Argentine trials may shed light on Panama mystery,  Eric Jackson, Panama News Online, 17 October 2001.
"Seeking Information" page for Jamal Lya from the U. S. Federal Bureau of Investigation

1994 in Panama
Accidents and incidents involving the Embraer EMB 110 Bandeirante
00901
Antisemitic attacks and incidents
Aviation accidents and incidents in 1994
Aviation accidents and incidents in Panama
Hezbollah attacks
Islamic terrorist incidents in 1994
July 1994 crimes
July 1994 events in North America
Mass murder in 1994
Terrorist incidents in North America in 1994
Terrorist incidents in Panama
Suicide bombings in North America
Unsolved airliner bombings